Rhynchocyon is a genus of elephant shrew (or sengi) in the family Macroscelididae. Members of this genus are known colloquially as the checkered elephant shrews or giant sengis.
It contains the following five species:
Golden-rumped elephant shrew, Rhynchocyon chrysopygus
Checkered elephant shrew, Rhynchocyon cirnei
Black and rufous elephant shrew, Rhynchocyon petersi
Stuhlmann's elephant shrew, Rhynchocyon stuhlmanni
Grey-faced sengi, Rhynchocyon udzungwensis

Ecology 
The giant sengis are endemic to Africa, and usually live in lowland montane and dense forests, often "avoiding" edges of forest patches. They eat primarily insects such as beetles, termites, ants, and centipedes, using their proboscises to dig them from the soil and its tongue to lick them up. Their facial morphology limits their diets to tiny invertebrates, and unlike other members of Macroscelidea, do not supplement their diet with foods such as nuts or small fruits. 

They typically build ground level nests for shelter requiring dry leaf litter. The primary structure of a nest for R. udzungwensis, for example, consists of the excavation of a cup-like indentation in the soil, layered with leaves, and the covered with looser leaves as a roof covering. They usually construct their nests at the base of trees. They also use hollowed, fallen trees or trunks to retreat in shelter.

They are typically active in the day (diurnal), spending their nights sheltered. Other Macroscelidea species are known to bask in the sun as a method of thermoregulation to save energy. Giant sengis do not bask—and it is most likely due to their adaptation to shaded canopy forest environments.

Sengis live in monogamous pairs, defending hectare-sized territories. Pairs spend little time together except when the female is in estrous. Mating occurs quickly and offspring grow quickly with minimal parental investment—none of which of is paternal.

Each species exhibits distinct and varying coat patterns and colors. Species and subspecies found in denser forests exhibit darker coloration and patterns while open woodland species exhibit lighter, chequers. The darker species R. petersi, R. chrysopygus, and R. udzungwensis still contain vestigial chequers, but are masked by the blended dark fur between them. This makes coat patterns an unreliable indicator of species delineation. The species are described as follows:

R. chrysopygus exhibits a bright yellow patch of fur on its rump with very little black coloration at all. R. chrysopygus has a unique dermal shield (a specialized thickening of skin) on its rump.
R. petersi has mostly orange-rufous coloration on its feet, ears, tail, chest, and on its face. Black fur extends from its rump and thighs up to its shoulders.
R. udzungwensis has black feet, ears and a tail. Its face is griseous grey with its lower rump and thighs are black. The chest is pale yellow.
R. cirnei and its subspecies feature six dark-colored stripes and spots (chequers) on its back. They contain little to no black fur, are lighter in color, and differ markedly by their lack of orange-rufous coloration found on its coastal relatives R. petersi, R. chrysopygus, and R.  udzungwensis. The subspecies R. c. macrurus exhibits a clinal variation different from coastal populations towards inland populations.
R. stuhlmanni exhibits a similar coloration and pattern as R. cirnei differing notably by its white tail.

Taxonomy, distribution, and speciation 
The genus' taxonomic status has been difficult to determine due to the very close similarities between populations. Up to ten species have been recognized, but over time they have been regrouped into four species. Recently, R. cirnei, the species with the most subspecies, has had R. c. stuhlmanni separated into its own species based on updated molecular data.

R. chrysopyguus, R. cirnei, and R. petersi are allopatrically distributed; with the more recently discovered R. udzungwensis and subspecies R. cirnei reichardi exhibiting parapatric distributions. Some introgression (hybridization) has taken place between R. udzungwensis and R. cirnei reichardi as detected by mtDNA. 

Estimated of population size and density vary and can be difficult to determine. However, measurements of the species populations has been undertaken. R. chrysopyguus, in protected areas, is about 150 individuals per square kilometer (about 20,000 individuals); R. petersi is between 19–80 individuals per square kilometer; R. udzungwensis has an estimated 15,000–24,000 individuals. R. udzungwensis has a tiny distribution compared to the other species but resides in a protected forest.

References

External links 
Sengis.org is an overview website concerning all the sengi species maintained by researcher Galen B Rathbun of the university of the California Academy of Sciences. It hosts images, videos, bibliographies, among other topics about the order Macroscelididae.

Elephant shrews
Mammal genera
Taxa named by Wilhelm Peters
Taxonomy articles created by Polbot